The stremma ( stremmata; , strémma) is a Greek unit of land area equal to 1,000 square metres.

History
The ancient Greek equivalent was the square plethron, which served as the Greeks' form of the acre. It was originally defined as the distance plowed by a team of oxen in a day but was nominally standardized as the area enclosed by a square 100 Greek feet (pous) to a side. It was the size of a Greek wrestling square.

It was originally also known as the "plethron" but this was eventually replaced by "stremma", derived from the verb for "turning" the ground with a Byzantine plow.

The Ottoman stremma, often called the Turkish stremma, is the Greek (and occasionally English) name for the dunam, which in turn is probably derived from the Byzantine unit. Again, this varied by region: some values include , and 1,600 m2.

Conversions
One modern stremma is equivalent to:

Metric
1,000 square metres
0.1 hectares
0.001 square kilometres

Imperial
10,763.9 square feet
0.247 105 38 acres
0.000 386 102 square miles

See also
1 E3 m² for further comparisons
 Byzantine units
Conversion of units
 Greek units
 Metric units

Bibliography

Units of area
Human-based units of measurement
Metricated units